Left of the Isar, Right of the Spree is a 1940 German comedy film directed by Paul May and starring Fritz Kampers, Leo Peukert and Charlotte Schellhorn.

It was made at the Bavaria Studios in Munich. The film's sets were designed by Hans Kuhnert.

Cast
 Fritz Kampers as Xaver Spöckmeier
 Leo Peukert as Georg Oberhauser
 Charlotte Schellhorn as Anni Spöckmeier
 Fritz Genschow as Alfred Schulze
 Grethe Weiser as Erna
 Hilde Sessak as Lotte
 Hans Adalbert Schlettow as Baron Wickinger
 Oscar Sabo as Vater Schulze
 Hermine Ziegler as Sophie Spöckmeier
 Martin Schmidhofer as Pepperl Spöckmeier
 Lotte Spira as Mutter Schulze
 Vera Complojer as Tante Berta
 Margarete Haagen as Tante Rosa
 Wilhelmine Fröhlich as Theres
 Josef Eichheim as 1. Stammtischfreund
 Ernst Sattler as 2. Stammtischfreund
 Franz Fröhlich as 3. Stammtischfreund
 Erika Glässner as Pensionswirtin

References

Bibliography

External links 
 

German comedy films
1940 comedy films
1940 films
Films of Nazi Germany
1940s German-language films
Films directed by Paul May
Bavaria Film films
German black-and-white films
Films shot at Bavaria Studios
UFA GmbH films
Films scored by Ludwig Schmidseder
1940s German films